Clyde Elliott Croft  is a retired Australian jurist who sat as a Trials Division Judge in the Supreme Court of Victoria and as a judge of the Commercial Court until 2019.

Croft is a former Examiner in Commercial Tenancy Law in the Solicitors’ Specialist Accreditation Scheme, and senior advisor to the Small Business Commissioner of Victoria.

References

Judges of the Supreme Court of Victoria
Living people
Year of birth missing (living people)
Place of birth missing (living people)
University of Melbourne alumni
Members of the Order of Australia